Leptodeira tarairiu is a species of snake in the family Colubridae.  The species is native to Brazil.

References

Leptodeira
Snakes of South America
Reptiles of Brazil
Endemic fauna of Brazil
Reptiles described in 2022